Yamaguchi Broadcasting Co., Ltd. (山口放送 later named KRY) is a Japanese television and radio broadcasting company serving the city of Shūnan and Yamaguchi Prefecture. The initials come from K. K. Radio Yamaguchi.

Network

TV 
 Nippon News Network (NNN) and Nippon Television Network System (NNS)

RADIO 
 Japan Radio Network (JRN)
 National Radio Network (NRN)

Supplement 
 Despite being a local station, it has five or more helicopters which are placed in its headquarters, the highest number for a local station.

Station list

Analog Television 
 Hagi 4ch
 Iwakuni 11ch
 Kanmon(Shimonoseki) JOPM-TV 4ch
 Nagato 10ch
 Shunan(Yamaguchi) JOPF-TV 11ch
 Susa-Tamagawa 10ch etc...
 Ube 61ch
 Yamaguchi-Konomine 46ch

Digital Television(ID:4) 
 Iwakuni 39ch
 Kanmon(Shimonoseki) JOPM-TV 4ch
 Shunan(Yamaguchi) JOPF-DTV 20ch
Yamaguchi-Konomine 36ch

RADIO 
 Hagi JOPL 1485 kHz; 92.3 MHz FM
 Iwakuni JOPN 918 kHz; 92.3 MHz FM
 Shimonoseki JOPM 918 kHz; 92.3 MHz FM
 Shunan JOPF 765 kHz; 92.3 MHz FM
 Susatamagawa 765 kHz; 86.4 MHz FM
 Yamaguchi JOPO 1458 kHz; 92.3 MHz FM

Program

TV 
 KRY Sawayaka Morning
 Yukihiko Inoue Nekketu TV etc...
 Yuuji Miyake DOSHIROUTO
 One Piece

RADIO 
 HOT ZONE Ohayou KRY
 Ohiru ha ZENKAI Radio na jikan
 Swing Saturday etc...

External links
 HOMEPAGE

Television stations in Japan
Radio in Japan
Nippon News Network
Mass media in Yamaguchi (city)
Television channels and stations established in 1959